Kibbutz Yahel is a Reform kibbutz in southern Israel. Located in the Arabah region of the Negev desert, 60 kilometers  from the city of Eilat, it falls under the jurisdiction of Hevel Eilot Regional Council.

Etymology
The name is symbolic and means: "it shone (shined)". It comes from the Book of Job.

History
Established in 1977, it was the first kibbutz founded by the Reform movement.

References

Further reading
William F.S. Miles. Zion in the desert: American Jews in Israel’s Reform Kibbutzim. Albany, NY: State University of New York Press, 2007.

External links
Kibbutz Yahel Official website  
Kibbutz Yahel Country Inn Official website

Eilat
Kibbutzim
Kibbutz Movement
Religious Israeli communities
Reform Judaism in Israel
Populated places in Southern District (Israel)
1977 establishments in Israel
Populated places established in 1977
Reform Zionism